René Richard Cyr (born September 27, 1958) is a Canadian actor, playwright and theatre director from Quebec. He is most noted for his roles as barber Méo Bellemare in the films Babine and Ésimésac and as drag queen Veronica Sinclair in Cover Girl, and as the stage director of many theatrical plays by Michel Tremblay.<ref>"René Richard Cyr et Michel Tremblay : un duo prolifique depuis 30 ans". Culture club (Ici Radio-Canada Première, April 30, 2017.</ref>

Born in Montreal, he is a graduate of the National Theatre School of Canada. Although he has had film and television roles, he is most prominently a stage actor. As a playwright, his works have included Volte-face, La Magnifique Aventure de Denis St-Onge, Marco chaussait des dix, Camille C., L'An de grâce, L'Apprentissage des marais and Les Huit péchés capitaux (Éloges)''.

He is out as gay.

References

External links

1958 births
20th-century Canadian dramatists and playwrights
20th-century Canadian male actors
20th-century Canadian male writers
21st-century Canadian dramatists and playwrights
21st-century Canadian male actors
21st-century Canadian male writers
Canadian male dramatists and playwrights
Canadian male film actors
Canadian male stage actors
Canadian male television actors
Canadian dramatists and playwrights in French
Canadian theatre directors
LGBT theatre directors
Canadian gay writers
Canadian gay actors
Male actors from Montreal
Writers from Montreal
National Theatre School of Canada alumni
Living people
Canadian LGBT dramatists and playwrights
Gay dramatists and playwrights
21st-century Canadian LGBT people
20th-century Canadian LGBT people